Seyhan Müzik is a Turkish record label founded in 1987. Around 2005 they bought up the rights to Sezen Aksu's recordings. Two of Özgün's albums, Elveda and Nöbetçi Aşık, were released through the label.

References

Turkish record labels